Vakhtang is a masculine given name in Georgian language. The name derives from an ancient Persian expression, "vahrka-tanū," meaning of which translates into "wolf-bodied." Some sources argue that the meaning of the name could possibly be a representation of wolf cult, widely practiced in ancient Georgia.

Shorter version of the name Vakho is an etymologically related variant of "Vakhtang," also commonly used in modern Georgian language.

Notable people

Royalty 
 Vakhtang I of Iberia, Georgian king
 Vakhtang II of Georgia, Georgian king
 Vakhtang III of Georgia, Georgian king
 Vakhtang IV of Georgia, Georgian king
 Vakhtang V of Kartli, Georgian king
 Vakhtang VI of Kartli, Georgian king
 Vakhtang, son of David IV of Georgia, Georgian prince
 Vakhtang, Duke of Aragvi, also known as "Vakhtang the Good"

Actors, artists, and poets 

 Vakhtang Kikabidze, Georgian actor
 Vakhtang Orbeliani, Georgian poet
 Vakhtang Chabukiani, Georgian ballet dancer
 Vakhtang Mchedelov, Russian director
 Vakhtang Murvanidze, Georgian figure skater
 Vakhtang Jordania, Georgian conductor
 Vakhtang Kakhidze, Georgian composer and conductor

Athletes 

 Vakhtang Iagorashvili, Georgian-Soviet pentathlete
 Vakhtang Blagidze, Georgian olympic gold medalist
 Vakhtang Pantskhava, Georgian football player
 Vakhtang Khvadagiani, Georgian football player
 Vakhtang Koridze, Georgian football player

Military 

 Vakhtang Kapanadze, Georgian brigadier general
 Vakhtang "Loti" Kobalia, Georgian colonel

Other 
 Vakhtang Kolbaia, Abkhaz politician
 Baktangios, Byzantine dignitary 
 Vakhtang Lejava, academic

Georgian masculine given names